An Evening with John Petrucci and Jordan Rudess is an album by fellow Dream Theater bandmates John Petrucci (guitars) and Jordan Rudess (keyboards). This album is unusual in being performed live (except for the last track) by just these two musicians, and only guitar and keyboards. The live recording was made on June 10, 2000 at the Helen Hayes Performing Arts Center  in Nyack, New York. "The Rena Song" was dedicated to John Petrucci's wife Rena Sands Petrucci.

Track listing
All songs by John Petrucci & Jordan Rudess, except where noted.

 "Furia Taurina" – 10:10
 "Truth" – 9:48
 "Fife and Drum" – 9:30
 "State of Grace" – 5:45
 "Hang 11" – 11:38
 "From Within" (Jordan Rudess) – 5:21
 "The Rena Song" (John Petrucci) – 7:03
 "In the Moment" – 6:27
 "Black Ice" – 10:54
 "Bite of the Mosquito (studio version)" – 1:53

Notes
 Tracks  7 and 10 appear only on the rerelease.
 "State of Grace" was originally released by Liquid Tension Experiment on their first album.

Personnel
John Petrucci: guitars
Jordan Rudess: keyboards

References

John Petrucci albums
2001 live albums